Booker Tyrone Edgerson (born July 5, 1939) is a former American football player.  This graduate of Western Illinois University was a cornerstone of the American Football League Buffalo Bills' defense in the mid-1960s, at left cornerback.

A four-year letterman (football, baseball, wrestling, track and field); in 1959 and 1960, he led the WIU football team to the only consecutive undefeated seasons in school history, and is in the WIU Hall of Fame.

Booker was born in Baxter County, Arkansas.  He signed as a free agent with the Bills in 1962 and stepped into a starting role at left cornerback.  He made a career-high six interceptions (including two in his first game, against Hall of Famer George Blanda), and was named to the AFL All-Rookie team.

Edgerson's college background as a sprinter and long jumper served him well in the demanding role of man-to-man pass coverage. The AFL featured many dangerous receivers at that time including San Diego's Lance Alworth. But Edgerson became one of the key components of the league's best defense, and he was the only man ever to catch Alworth from behind in a game.

Edgerson appeared in playoffs four consecutive years, and in three straight AFL Championship games. The Bills beat the San Diego Chargers in 1964 and again in 1965, when Edgerson was selected as an American Football League All-Star.

Edgerson had 23 interceptions in his eight-year career in Buffalo, and scored on two, including one against Joe Namath. He also forced and returned a fumble for the deciding score in a 1969 game against the Cincinnati Bengals, played in blizzard conditions.

Edgerson retired to Buffalo, where he has been involved in numerous charitable endeavors through the Bills Alumni, and was the 1993 recipient of the Ralph C. Wilson Award.  He is a member of the Greater Buffalo Sports Hall of Fame.

Edgerson was selected to be the 2010 Buffalo Bills Wall of Fame inductee where his name was revealed during a halftime ceremony on October 3 during the Bills game against AFC rival New York Jets.

Edgerson wrote the foreword to The Cookie That Did Not Crumble, the autobiography of his former teammate, Cookie Gilchrist.

See also
 List of American Football League players

References

1939 births
Living people
American football cornerbacks
Buffalo Bills players
Denver Broncos players
Western Illinois Leathernecks baseball players
Western Illinois Leathernecks football players
American Football League All-Star players
People from Baxter County, Arkansas
Players of American football from Arkansas
American Football League players